Morrow Hall is a historic building in Batesville, Arkansas. It was entered into the National Register of Historic Places in October 1972.

Built in 1873, this was the first permanent building of Arkansas College (now Lyon College), the oldest continuing private college in the state of Arkansas. Three other academic buildings once stood on the block - the Long Memorial Building, on the site of the Presbyterian sanctuary; the chapel, which stood between Long and Morrow; and the gymnasium, which has been remodeled to serve as the present church Fellowship Hall, immediately behind Morrow.

Morrow Hall stands as it was originally built. It is an "academic house," with Italianate pressed tin window trim and projecting central bay. It is now used by the First Presbyterian Church.

Notes

University and college buildings on the National Register of Historic Places in Arkansas
School buildings completed in 1873
Buildings and structures in Batesville, Arkansas
Italianate architecture in Arkansas
Lyon College
National Register of Historic Places in Independence County, Arkansas
1873 establishments in Arkansas